Maria Harrison is a plant biologist, William H. Crocker Scientist professor at the Boyce Thompson Institute for Plant Science, and adjunct professor in the School of Integrative Plant Science at Cornell University. Harrison's lab, including post-doctoral, graduate, undergraduate, and intern students, utilizes a combination of molecular, cell biology, genetic, and genomic techniques to investigate the developmental mechanisms underlying the symbiosis and phosphate transfer between arbuscular mycorrhizal fungi (AM fungi; AMF) (including Glomus versiforme, Glomus intraradices, and Gigaspora gigantea) and the roots of model legume Medicago truncatula. Among Harrison's most notable findings are that plants use hormone signaling to regulate AM fungi symbiosis and that phosphate transport is critical to the maintenance of this symbiosis. These discoveries have allowed the field of fungal-plant interactions to pursue new research questions including future manipulation of phosphate acquisition in valuable crop species.

She was elected a member of the National Academy of Sciences in April 2019.

She received her doctorate in biochemistry from the University of Manchester in 1987.

Honors and awards 
 Cornell University College of Agriculture and Life Sciences Faculty Excellence in Undergraduate Research Mentoring Award (2015)
 The Dennis R. Hoagland Award (2015)
 American Academy of Microbiology (AAM) Fellow (2013)
 American Association for the Advancement of Science (AAAS) Fellow (2012)
 William H. Crocker Scientist (2011)

Patents

References 

Living people
Cornell University faculty
American women botanists
American botanists
Place of birth missing (living people)
Year of birth missing (living people)
Members of the United States National Academy of Sciences
American women academics
21st-century American women